INS Nilgiri is the lead ship of the  stealth guided missile frigates being built by Mazagon Shipyard Dock Limited for the Indian Navy. The ship was laid down on 28 December 2017 and it was launched on 28 September 2019. The ship is expected to be commissioned by November 2022.

See also
 Future of the Indian Navy

References

Frigates of the Indian Navy
2019 ships
Nilgiri-class frigate (2019)
Ships built in India